The Augustas (filmed in the 1930s and the 1940s) is a home movie made by Scott Nixon, a traveling insurance agent from Augusta, Georgia and an avid member of the Amateur Cinema League who enjoyed recording his life and travels on film. It lasts approximately 16 minutes.

The silent film documents approximately 38 cities, towns, and locations named "Augusta" across the Eastern, Midwestern, Central, and Southern United States. Arranged in no specific order, the film strings together brief scenes and shots of these communities, indicated through intertitles, postcards, or the point of a pencil on a train timetable or road map. The scenes vary, ranging from street scenes and landscapes to shots focusing on local businesses, post offices, train stations, business signs, street signs (typically town signs or fingerposts), and prominent buildings in each town, most of which usually have "Augusta" featured.

Nixon recorded The Augustas using both 8 mm and 16 mm movie cameras loaded with both black-and-white and color film stock. Throughout his life, Nixon recorded over 76,000 feet of film. His work, including The Augustas, currently resides in the collection of the University of South Carolina.

Nixon later made a similar film, Augustas of the USA, around the 1960s. Approximately 5 minutes in length, Augustas of the USA features significantly less "Augustas", with many appearing in name only, but includes new footage, including aerial views from a small plane and scenes in Augusta, Georgia.

"Augustas" featured 

 Augusta, Kansas
 Augusta, New Jersey
 Augusta, Indianapolis, Indiana
 New Augusta, Indianapolis, Indiana
 Augusta, Missouri
 Augusta, Maryland, a spot on the former Baltimore and Ohio Railroad Washington County branch line
 Augusta, Arkansas
 Augusta, Maine
 Augusta, Kentucky
 Augusta, Michigan
 Augusta, Illinois
 Staunton, Virginia (located in Augusta County, Virginia)
 Augusta Springs, Virginia
 West Augusta, Virginia
 Augusta, Ohio
 Augusta, West Virginia
 Augusta, New Hampshire
 Augusta, Minnesota
 Augustaville, Pennsylvania
 Fort Augusta, Sunbury, Pennsylvania
 Augusta, Iowa
 Augusta, Oklahoma
 Augusta, Texas
 Augusta Avenue, Savannah, Georgia
 Augusta Road and Augusta Street, Greenville, South Carolina
 South Augusta, Augusta, Georgia
 Augusta, Georgia
 New Augusta, Mississippi
 Augusta, Avoyelles Parish, Louisiana
 Augusta, Plaquemines Parish, Louisiana
 Augusta, Iberville Parish, Louisiana
 Augusta, Montana

National Film Registry
On December 19, 2012, The Augustas was selected for preservation in the United States National Film Registry by the Library of Congress as being "culturally, historically, or aesthetically significant".

References

External links
 
The Augustas--Nixon--home movies, 1930 | ArchivesSpace Public Interface

1930s documentary films
Black-and-white documentary films
1940s documentary films
American documentary films
United States National Film Registry films
Documentary films about transport
1950s documentary films
Documentary films about the United States
American black-and-white films
Documentary films about Georgia (U.S. state)
1950s English-language films
1940s English-language films
1930s English-language films
1950s American films
Augusta, Kentucky